The Attorney-General of Barbados is the primary legal advisor to the Government of Barbados.

Legal basis
According to Article 72 of the Constitution of Barbados, the Attorney-General holds ministerial rank in the government. He may, in the case of certain offences, give general or special directions to the Director of Public Prosecutions, which the latter must follow.

List of attorneys-general

Robert Hooper c.1693 
Edward Chilton, 1698 to 1705 
Thomas Hodges, FRS ?1706 to ?1721 
Jonathan Blenman, 1726 to  
Blenman 1728 to 
Timothy Blenman, 1741 to 
Henry Beckles, 1770 to 1772 
Robert Burnett
Anthony Chester
Robert Burnett Jones
John Beckles, 1807 to 1823 
Matthew Coulthurst, to 1824 
Samuel Hinds, 1824 to 1826 
Henry Edward Sharpe, 1826 to 1828 
John Paynter Musson, 1828 to 1831 
Henry Edward Sharpe, 1831 to c. 1838 
post of Attorney-General of Barbados vacant, c. 1838 to 1841
Henry Edward Sharpe, 1841 to 1846 
John Sealy, 1846 to >1869 
Francis Fleming, 1878 to 1882
William Conrad Reeves, 1882 to 1886
Sir Henry Alleyne Bovell, 1886 to aft.1893
G. Aubrey Goodman, 1907 to 1913
Hon Sir Charles Pitcher Clarke, 1913 to ? (died 1926)
Ernest Allan Collymore, 1928 to 1936
Edward Keith Walcott, 1936 to 1946
Sir William Campbell Wylie, 1951 to 1955
 Barbados became independent, 1966
Sir Frederick Smith, 1966 to 1971
George Moe, 1971 to 1976 
Sir Henry de Boulay Forde, 1976 to 1981 
Louis Randall Tull, 1981 to 1985
Sir David Anthony Simmons, 1985 to 1986
Maurice Athelstan King, 1986 to 1994
Sir David Anthony Simmons, 1994 to 2001
Mia Mottley, 2001 to 2003 [1st female]
Dale Marshall, 2006 to 2008
Freundel Stuart, 2008 to 2010 (departed the position to become acting PM)
Adriel Brathwaite, 2010 to 2018 
Dale Marshall, 2018 to Present

See also

 Justice ministry
 Politics of Barbados

References

External links
The Office of the Attorney-General of Barbados

 
Justice ministries
Government of Barbados
Lists of political office-holders in Barbados